Daniel Mark Williams (born December 1981) is an English cricketer.  Williams is a right-handed batsman who bowls right-arm medium-fast.  He was born in Newbury, Berkshire.

Williams made his debut for Berkshire in the 2001 Minor Counties Championship against Dorset.  He made a further appearance for Berkshire in the 2003 Minor Counties Championship against Cheshire.  Later, while studying for his degree at Loughborough University, Williams made his first-class debut for Loughborough UCCE against Surrey in 2008.  He made a further appearance for the team in 2008, against Gloucestershire.  In his two first-class matches, he scored 25 runs at an average of 8.33, with a high score of 11.

References

External links
Daniel Williams at ESPNcricinfo
Daniel Williams at CricketArchive

1981 births
Living people
People from Newbury, Berkshire
Alumni of Loughborough University
English cricketers
Berkshire cricketers
Loughborough MCCU cricketers